Ageing or aging is the process of becoming older. The term refers mainly to humans, many other animals, and fungi, whereas for example, bacteria, perennial plants and some simple animals are potentially biologically immortal. In a broader sense, ageing can refer to single cells within an organism which have ceased dividing, or to the population of a species.

In humans, ageing represents the accumulation of changes in a human being over time and can encompass physical, psychological, and social changes. Reaction time, for example, may slow with age, while memories and general knowledge typically increase. Ageing increases the risk of human diseases such as cancer, Alzheimer's disease, diabetes, cardiovascular disease, stroke and many more. Of the roughly 150,000 people who die each day across the globe, about two-thirds die from age-related causes.

Current ageing theories are assigned to the damage concept, whereby the accumulation of damage (such as DNA oxidation) may cause biological systems to fail, or to the programmed ageing concept, whereby the internal processes (epigenetic maintenance such as DNA methylation) inherently may cause ageing. Programmed ageing should not be confused with programmed cell death (apoptosis).

Obesity has been proposed to accelerate ageing, whereas dietary calorie restriction in non-primate animals slows ageing while maintaining good health and body functions. In primates (including humans), such life-extending effects remain uncertain.

Ageing versus immortality 

Human beings and members of other species, especially animals, age and die. Fungi, too, can age. In contrast, many species can be considered potentially immortal: for example, bacteria fission to produce daughter cells, strawberry plants grow runners to produce clones of themselves, and animals in the genus Hydra have a regenerative ability by which they avoid dying of old age.

Early life forms on Earth, starting at least 3.7 billion years ago, were single-celled organisms (an organism that consists of a single cell, unlike a multicellular organism that consists of multiple cells). Such organisms (Prokaryotes, Protozoans, algae) multiply by fission into daughter cells. (Daughter cells are cells that result from a single dividing parent cell. Two daughter cells are the result of the mitotic process while four cells result from the meiotic process. For organisms that reproduce via sexual reproduction, daughter cells result from meiosis); thus do not age and are potentially immortal under favorable conditions.

Aging and mortality of the individual organism became possible with the evolution of sexual reproduction, which occurred with the emergence of the fungal/animal kingdoms approximately a billion years ago, and the evolution of seed-producing plants 320 million years ago. The sexual organism could henceforth pass on some of its genetic material to produce new individuals and could itself become disposable with respect to the survival of its species. This classic biological idea has however been perturbed recently by the discovery that the bacterium E. coli may split into distinguishable daughter cells, which opens the theoretical possibility of "age classes" among bacteria.

Even within humans and other mortal species, there are cells with the potential for immortality: cancer cells which have lost the ability to die when maintained in a cell culture such as the HeLa cell line, and specific stem cells such as germ cells (producing ova and spermatozoa). In artificial cloning, adult cells can be rejuvenated to embryonic status and then used to grow a new tissue or animal without ageing. Normal human cells however die after about 50 cell divisions in laboratory culture (the Hayflick Limit, discovered by Leonard Hayflick in 1961).

Signs 

A number of characteristic ageing symptoms are experienced by a majority or by a significant proportion of humans during their lifetimes.
 Teenagers lose the young child's ability to hear high-frequency sounds above 20 kHz.
 Wrinkles develop mainly due to photoageing, particularly affecting sun-exposed areas (face).
 After peaking from the late teens to the late 20s, female fertility declines.
 After age 30 the mass of human body is decreased until 70 years and then shows damping oscillations. 
 People over 35 years of age are at increasing risk for losing strength in the ciliary muscle of the eyes which leads to difficulty focusing on close objects, or presbyopia. Most people experience presbyopia by age 45–50. The cause is lens hardening by decreasing levels of alpha-crystallin, a process which may be sped up by higher temperatures.
 Around age 50, hair turns grey. Pattern hair loss by the age of 50 affects about 30–50% of males and a quarter of females.
 Menopause typically occurs between 44 and 58 years of age.
  In the 60–64 age cohort, the incidence of osteoarthritis rises to 53%. Only 20% however report disabling osteoarthritis at this age.
  Almost half of people older than 75 have hearing loss (presbycusis) inhibiting spoken communication. Many vertebrates such as fish, birds and amphibians do not develop presbycusis in old age as they are able to regenerate their cochlear sensory cells, whereas mammals including humans have genetically lost this ability.
  By age 80, more than half of all Americans either have a cataract or have had cataract surgery.
 Frailty, a syndrome of decreased strength, physical activity, physical performance and energy, affects 25% of those over 85. Muscles have a reduced capacity of responding to exercise or injury and loss of muscle mass and strength (sarcopenia) is common. Maximum oxygen utilization and maximum heart rate decline. Hand strength and mobility decrease.
 Atherosclerosis is classified as an ageing disease. It leads to cardiovascular disease (for example stroke and heart attack) which globally is the most common cause of death. Vessel ageing causes vascular remodeling and loss of arterial elasticity and as a result causes the stiffness of the vasculature. 
 Recent evidence suggests that age-related risk of death plateaus after age 105. The maximum human lifespan is suggested to be 115 years. The oldest reliably recorded human was Jeanne Calment who died in 1997 at 122.

Dementia becomes more common with age. About 3% of people between the ages of 65 and 74, 19% between 75 and 84, and nearly half of those over 85 years of age have dementia. The spectrum ranges from mild cognitive impairment to the neurodegenerative diseases of Alzheimer's disease, cerebrovascular disease, Parkinson's disease and Lou Gehrig's disease. Furthermore, many types of memory decline with ageing, but not semantic memory or general knowledge such as vocabulary definitions, which typically increases or remains steady until late adulthood (see Ageing brain). Intelligence declines with age, though the rate varies depending on the type and may in fact remain steady throughout most of the lifespan, dropping suddenly only as people near the end of their lives. Individual variations in the rate of cognitive decline may therefore be explained in terms of people having different lengths of life. There are changes to the brain: after 20 years of age there is a 10% reduction each decade in the total length of the brain's myelinated axons.

Age can result in visual impairment, whereby non-verbal communication is reduced, which can lead to isolation and possible depression. Older adults, however, may not experience depression as much as younger adults, and were paradoxically found to have improved mood despite declining physical health. Macular degeneration causes vision loss and increases with age, affecting nearly 12% of those above the age of 80. This degeneration is caused by systemic changes in the circulation of waste products and by growth of abnormal vessels around the retina. Other visual diseases that often appear with age would be cataracts and glaucoma. A cataract occurs when the lens of the eye becomes cloudy making vision blurry and eventually causing blindness if untreated. They develop over time and are seen most often with those that are older. Cataracts can be treated through surgery. Glaucoma is another common visual disease that appears in older adults. Glaucoma is caused by damage to the optic nerve causing vision loss. Glaucoma usually develops over time but there are variations to glaucoma, and some have sudden onset. There are a few procedures for glaucoma but there is no cure or fix for the damage once it has happened. Prevention is the best measure in the case of glaucoma.

A distinction can be made between "proximal ageing" (age-based effects that come about because of factors in the recent past) and "distal ageing" (age-based differences that can be traced to a cause in a person's early life, such as childhood poliomyelitis).

Ageing is among the greatest known risk factors for most human diseases. Of the roughly 150,000 people who die each day across the globe, about two-thirds—100,000 per day—die from age-related causes. In industrialized nations, the proportion is higher, reaching 90%.

Biological basis 

At present, researchers are only just beginning to understand the biological basis of ageing even in relatively simple and short-lived organisms such as yeast. Less still is known of mammalian ageing, in part due to the much longer lives of even small mammals such as the mouse (around 3 years). A model organism for the study of ageing is the nematode C. elegans. Thanks to its short lifespan of 2–3 weeks, our ability to easily perform genetic manipulations or to suppress gene activity with RNA interference, or other factors. Most known mutations and RNA interference targets that extend lifespan were first discovered in C. elegans.

The factors proposed to influence biological ageing fall into two main categories, programmed and damage-related. Programmed factors follow a biological timetable, perhaps one that might be a continuation of the one that regulates childhood growth and development. This regulation would depend on changes in gene expression that affect the systems responsible for maintenance, repair and defense responses. Damage-related factors include internal and environmental assaults to living organisms that induce cumulative damage at various levels. A third, novel, concept is that ageing is mediated by vicious cycles.

Molecular and cellular hallmarks of ageing 

In a detailed review, Lopez-Otin and colleagues (2013), who discuss ageing through the lens of the damage theory, propose nine metabolic "hallmarks" of ageing in various organisms but especially mammals:
 genomic instability (mutations accumulated in nuclear DNA, in mtDNA, and in the nuclear lamina)
 telomere attrition (the authors note that artificial telomerase confers non-cancerous immortality to otherwise mortal cells)
 epigenetic alterations (including DNA methylation patterns, post-translational modification of histones, and chromatin remodelling)
 loss of proteostasis (protein folding and proteolysis)
 deregulated nutrient sensing (relating to the Growth hormone/Insulin-like growth factor 1 signalling pathway, which is the most conserved ageing-controlling pathway in evolution and among its targets are the FOXO3/Sirtuin transcription factors and the mTOR complexes, probably responsive to caloric restriction)
 mitochondrial dysfunction (the authors point out however that a causal link between ageing and increased mitochondrial production of reactive oxygen species is no longer supported by recent research)
 cellular senescence (accumulation of no longer dividing cells in certain tissues, a process induced especially by p16INK4a/Rb and p19ARF/p53 to stop cancerous cells from proliferating)
 stem cell exhaustion (in the authors' view caused by damage factors such as those listed above)
 altered intercellular communication (encompassing especially inflammation but possibly also other intercellular interactions
inflammageing, a chronic inflammatory phenotype in the elderly in the absence of viral infection, due to over-activation and a decrease in the precision of the innate immune system.
 dysbiosis of gut microbiome (e.g., loss of microbial diversity, expansion of enteropathogens, and altered vitamin B12 biosynthesis) is correlated with biological age rather than chronological age.

Metabolic pathways involved in ageing 
There are three main metabolic pathways which can influence the rate of ageing, discussed below:
 the FOXO3/Sirtuin pathway, probably responsive to caloric restriction
 the Growth hormone/Insulin-like growth factor 1 signalling pathway
 the activity levels of the electron transport chain in mitochondria and (in plants) in chloroplasts.

It is likely that most of these pathways affect ageing separately, because targeting them simultaneously leads to additive increases in lifespan.

Programmed factors
The rate of ageing varies substantially across different species, and this, to a large extent, is genetically based. For example, numerous perennial plants ranging from strawberries and potatoes to willow trees typically produce clones of themselves by vegetative reproduction and are thus potentially immortal, while annual plants such as wheat and watermelons die each year and reproduce by sexual reproduction. In 2008 it was discovered that inactivation of only two genes in the annual plant Arabidopsis thaliana leads to its conversion into a potentially immortal perennial plant. The oldest animals known so far are 15,000-year-old Antarctic sponges, which can reproduce both sexually and clonally.

Clonal immortality apart, there are certain species whose individual lifespans stand out among Earth's life-forms, including the bristlecone pine at 5062 years or 5067 years, invertebrates like the hard clam (known as quahog in New England) at 508 years, the Greenland shark at 400 years, various deep-sea tube worms at over 300 years, fish like the sturgeon and the rockfish, and the sea anemone and lobster. Such organisms are sometimes said to exhibit negligible senescence. The genetic aspect has also been demonstrated in studies of human centenarians.

In laboratory settings, researchers have demonstrated that selected alterations in specific genes can extend lifespan quite substantially in yeast and roundworms, less so in fruit flies and less again in mice.  Some of the targeted genes have homologues across species and in some cases have been associated with human longevity. Studies by Becca Levy, an associate professor of epidemiology and psychology at the Yale School of Public Health, have found that positive beliefs about ageing may also increase life span.
 DNA methylation: The strong effect of age on DNA methylation levels has been known since the late 1960s. Geneticist Steve Horvath hypothesised that DNA methylation age measures the cumulative effect of an epigenetic maintenance system but details are unknown. DNA methylation age of blood predicts all-cause mortality in later life. The epigenetic clock theory of ageing recognizes ageing as a by-product or unintended consequence of developmental and maintenance processes. Furthermore, prematurely aged mice can be rejuvenated and their lives extended by 30% by partially "resetting" the methylation pattern in their cells (a full reset leads to undesirable immortal cancer cells). This resetting into a juvenile state was experimentally achieved in 2016 by activating the four Yamanaka DNA transcription factors – Sox2, Oct4, Klf4 and c-Myc (which have previously been routinely used for producing young animals from cloned adult skin cells).
 Senescent cells: most of the cells with DNA damages that can't be fixed do apoptosis but some cells don't. Those cells are related to many diseases such as kidney failure and diabetes. In 2016, in a study, the removal of those cells in mice has extended their lifespans by 20% to 30%. Another study shows that this issue is related to the p16INK4a and β-galactosidase. Significant results have been obtained by some companies to extend mouse lifespan focusing on senescent cells.
 A variation in the gene FOXO3A has a positive effect on the life expectancy of humans, and is found much more often in people living to 100 and beyond – moreover, this appears to be true worldwide. FOXO3A acts on the sirtuin family of genes which also have a significant effect on lifespan in yeast and in nematodes. Sirtuin in turn inhibits mTOR.
 Caloric restriction leads to longer lifespans in various species, an effect that is unclear, but probably mediated by the nutrient-sensing function of the mTOR pathway.
 mTOR, a protein that inhibits autophagy, has been linked to ageing through the insulin signalling pathway. mTOR functions through nutrient and growth cues leading scientists to believe that dietary restriction and mTOR are related in terms of longevity.  When organisms restrict their diet, mTOR activity is reduced, which allows an increased level of autophagy. This recycles old or damaged cell parts, which increases longevity and decreases the chances of being obese. This is thought to prevent spikes of glucose concentration in the blood, leading to reduced insulin signalling. This has been linked to less mTOR activation as well.  Therefore, longevity has been connected to caloric restriction and insulin sensitivity inhibiting mTOR, which in turns allows autophagy to occur more frequently.  It may be that mTOR inhibition and autophagy reduce the effects of reactive oxygen species on the body, which damage DNA and other organic material, so longevity would be increased. In support of this contention are observations that several purported anti-ageing remedies such as rapamycin, metformin, berberine, 2-deoxyglucose, vitamin D3, aspirin and resveratrol were shown to suppress mTOR signaling and concurrently to reduce constitutive level of oxidative DNA damage induced by endogenous oxidants as well as to enhance the rate of autophagy
 A decreased Growth hormone/Insulin-like Growth Factor 1 signalling pathway has been associated with increased life span in various organisms including fruit flies, nematodes and mice. The precise mechanism by which decreased GH/IGF-1 signalling increases longevity is unknown, but various mouse strains with decreased GH and/or IGF-1 induced signalling share a similar phenotype which includes increased insulin sensitivity, enhanced stress resistance and protection from carcinogenesis. The studied mouse strains with decreased GH signalling showed between 20% and 68% increased longevity, and mouse strains with decreased IGF-1 induced signalling revealed a 19 to 33% increase in life span when compared to control mice.
 Over-expression of the Ras2 gene increases lifespan in yeast by 30%. A yeast mutant lacking the genes SCH9 and RAS1 has recently been shown to have a tenfold increase in lifespan under conditions of calorie restriction and is the largest increase achieved in any organism.
 Telomeres: In humans and other animals, cellular senescence has been attributed to the shortening of telomeres at each cell division; when telomeres become too short, the cells senesce and die or cease multiplying. The length of telomeres is therefore the "molecular clock", predicted by Hayflick. However, telomere length in wild mouse strains is unrelated to lifespan, and mice lacking the enzyme telomerase do not have a dramatically reduced lifespan. Laboratory mice's telomeres are many times longer than human ones. Another caveat is that a study following nearly 1000 humans for ten years showed that while some humans do shorten their telomeres over time, a third of the participants did not.

 The theory would explain why the autosomal dominant disease, Huntington's disease, can persist even though it is inexorably lethal. Also, it has been suggested that some of the genetic variants that increase fertility in the young increase cancer risk in the old.  Such variants occur in genes p53 and BRCA1.
 The reproductive-cell cycle theory argues that ageing is regulated specifically by reproductive hormones that act in an antagonistic pleiotropic manner via cell cycle signalling, promoting growth and development early in life to achieve reproduction, but becoming dysregulated later in life, driving senescence (dyosis) in a futile attempt to maintain reproductive ability. The endocrine dyscrasia that follows the loss of follicles with menopause, and the loss of Leydig and Sertoli cells during andropause, drive aberrant cell cycle signalling that leads to cell death and dysfunction, tissue dysfunction (disease) and ultimately death. Moreover, the hormones that regulate reproduction also regulate cellular metabolism, explaining the increases in fat deposition during pregnancy through to the deposition of centralised adiposity with the dysregulation of the HPG axis following menopause and during andropause (Atwood and Bowen, 2004). This theory, which introduced a new definition of ageing, has facilitated the conceptualisation of why and how ageing occurs at the evolutionary, physiological and molecular levels.
 Autoimmunity: The idea that ageing results from an increase in autoantibodies that attack the body's tissues. A number of diseases associated with ageing, such as atrophic gastritis and Hashimoto's thyroiditis, are probably autoimmune in this way. However, while inflammation is very much evident in old mammals, even completely immunodeficient mice raised in pathogen-free laboratory conditions still experience senescence.

 The cellular balance between energy generation and consumption (energy homeostasis) requires tight regulation during ageing. In 2011, it was demonstrated that acetylation levels of AMP-activated protein kinase change with age in yeast and that preventing this change slows yeast ageing.
 Skin ageing is caused in part by TGF-β, which reduces the subcutaneous fat that gives skin a pleasant appearance and texture.   TGF-β does this by blocking the conversion of dermal fibroblasts into fat cells; with fewer fat cells underneath to provide support, the skin becomes saggy and wrinkled.  Subcutaneous fat also produces cathelicidin, which is a peptide that fights bacterial infections.

Evolution of ageing 

Life span, like other phenotypes, is selected for in evolution. Traits that benefit early survival and reproduction will be selected for even if they contribute to an earlier death. Such a genetic effect is called the antagonistic pleiotropy effect when referring to a gene (pleiotropy signifying the gene has a double function – enabling reproduction at a young age but costing the organism life expectancy in old age) and is called the disposable soma effect when referring to an entire genetic programme (the organism diverting limited resources from maintenance to reproduction). The biological mechanisms which regulate lifespan probably evolved with the first multicellular organisms more than a billion years ago. However, even single-celled organisms such as yeast have been used as models in ageing, hence ageing has its biological roots much earlier than multi-cellularity.

Damage-related factors
 DNA damage theory of ageing: DNA damage is thought to be the common basis of both cancer and ageing, and it has been argued that intrinsic causes of DNA damage are the most important drivers of ageing. Genetic damage (aberrant structural alterations of the DNA), mutations (changes in the DNA sequence), and epimutations (methylation of gene promoter regions or alterations of the DNA scaffolding which regulate gene expression), can cause abnormal gene expression. DNA damage causes the cells to stop dividing or induces apoptosis, often affecting stem cell pools and hence hindering regeneration. However, lifelong studies of mice suggest that most mutations happen during embryonic and childhood development, when cells divide often, as each cell division is a chance for errors in DNA replication.
 Genetic instability: Dogs annually lose approximately 3.3% of the DNA in their heart muscle cells while humans lose approximately 0.6% of their heart muscle DNA each year.  These numbers are close to the ratio of the maximum longevities of the two species (120 years vs. 20 years, a 6/1 ratio).  The comparative percentage is also similar between the dog and human for yearly DNA loss in the brain and lymphocytes.  As stated by lead author, Bernard L. Strehler, "... genetic damage (particularly gene loss) is almost certainly (or probably the) central cause of ageing."
 Accumulation of waste:
 A buildup of waste products in cells presumably interferes with metabolism. For example, a waste product called lipofuscin is formed by a complex reaction in cells that binds fat to proteins. This waste accumulates in the cells as small granules, which increase in size as a person ages.
 The hallmark of ageing yeast cells appears to be overproduction of certain proteins.
 Autophagy induction can enhance clearance of toxic intracellular waste associated with neurodegenerative diseases and has been comprehensively demonstrated to improve lifespan in yeast, worms, flies, rodents and primates. The situation, however, has been complicated by the identification that autophagy up-regulation can also occur during ageing. Autophagy is enhanced in obese mice by caloric restriction, exercise, and a low fat diet (but in these mice is evidently not related with the activation of AMP-activated protein kinase, see above).
 Wear-and-tear theory: The very general idea that changes associated with ageing are the result of chance damage that accumulates over time.
 Accumulation of errors: The idea that ageing results from chance events that escape proof reading mechanisms, which gradually damages the genetic code.
 Heterochromatin loss, model of ageing.
 Transposable elements in genome disintegration as the primary role in the mechanism of ageing.
 Cross-linkage: The idea that ageing results from accumulation of cross-linked compounds that interfere with normal cell function.
 Studies of mtDNA mutator mice have shown that increased levels of somatic mtDNA mutations directly can cause a variety of ageing phenotypes. The authors propose that mtDNA mutations lead to respiratory-chain-deficient cells and thence to apoptosis and cell loss. They cast doubt experimentally however on the common assumption that mitochondrial mutations and dysfunction lead to increased generation of reactive oxygen species (ROS).
 Free-radical theory: Damage by free radicals, or more generally reactive oxygen species or oxidative stress, create damage that may give rise to the symptoms we recognise as ageing. Michael Ristow's group has provided evidence that the effect of calorie restriction may be due to increased formation of free radicals within the mitochondria, causing a secondary induction of increased antioxidant defence capacity.
Mitochondrial theory of ageing: free radicals produced by mitochondrial activity damage cellular components, leading to ageing.
 DNA oxidation and caloric restriction: Caloric restriction reduces 8-OH-dG DNA damage in organs of ageing rats and mice. Thus, reduction of oxidative DNA damage is associated with a slower rate of ageing and increased lifespan.  In a 2021 review article, Vijg stated that "Based on an abundance of evidence, DNA damage is now considered as the single most important driver of the degenerative processes that collectively cause aging."

Prevention and delay

Lifestyle
Caloric restriction substantially affects lifespan in many animals, including the ability to delay or prevent many age-related diseases. Typically, this involves caloric intake of 60–70% of what an ad libitum animal would consume, while still maintaining proper nutrient intake. In rodents, this has been shown to increase lifespan by up to 50%; similar effects occur for yeast and Drosophila. No lifespan data exist for humans on a calorie-restricted diet, but several reports support protection from age-related diseases. Two major ongoing studies on rhesus monkeys initially revealed disparate results; while one study, by the University of Wisconsin, showed that caloric restriction does extend lifespan, the second study, by the National Institute on Aging (NIA), found no effects of caloric restriction on longevity. Both studies nevertheless showed improvement in a number of health parameters. Notwithstanding the similarly low calorie intake, the diet composition differed between the two studies (notably a high sucrose content in the Wisconsin study), and the monkeys have different origins (India, China), initially suggesting that genetics and dietary composition, not merely a decrease in calories, are factors in longevity. However, in a comparative analysis in 2014, the Wisconsin researchers found that the allegedly non-starved NIA control monkeys in fact are moderately underweight when compared with other monkey populations, and argued this was due to the NIA's apportioned feeding protocol in contrast to Wisconsin's truly unrestricted ad libitum feeding protocol. They conclude that moderate calorie restriction rather than extreme calorie restriction is sufficient to produce the observed health and longevity benefits in the studied rhesus monkeys.

In his book How and Why We Age, Hayflick says that caloric restriction may not be effective in humans, citing data from the Baltimore Longitudinal Study of Aging which shows that being thin does not favour longevity. However, there may be confounders, e.g. smoking reduces both appetite and lifespan. Similarly, it is sometimes claimed that moderate obesity in later life may improve survival, but newer research has identified confounding factors such as weight loss due to terminal disease. Once these factors are accounted for, the optimal body weight above age 65 corresponds to a leaner body mass index of 23 to 27.

Alternatively, the benefits of dietary restriction can also be found by changing the macro nutrient profile to reduce protein intake without any changes to calorie level, resulting in similar increases in longevity. Dietary protein restriction not only inhibits mTOR activity but also IGF-1, two mechanisms implicated in ageing. Specifically, reducing leucine intake is sufficient to inhibit mTOR activity, achievable through reducing animal food consumption.

The Mediterranean diet is credited with lowering the risk of heart disease and early death. The major contributors to mortality risk reduction appear to be a higher consumption of vegetables, fish, fruits, nuts and monounsaturated fatty acids, i.e., olive oil.

On the other hand, the consumption of certain foods such as sugar, refined carbohydrates, alcohol, processed meats and fried food, accelerates ageing.

The amount of sleep has an impact on mortality. People who live the longest report sleeping for six to seven hours each night. Lack of sleep (<5 hours) more than doubles the risk of death from cardiovascular disease, but too much sleep (>9 hours) is associated with a doubling of the risk of death, though not primarily from cardiovascular disease. Sleeping more than 7 to 8 hours per day has been consistently associated with increased mortality, though the cause is probably other factors such as depression and socioeconomic status, which would correlate statistically. Sleep monitoring of hunter-gatherer tribes from Africa and from South America has shown similar sleep patterns across continents: their average sleeping duration is 6.4 hours (with a summer/winter difference of 1 hour), afternoon naps (siestas) are uncommon, and insomnia is very rare (tenfold less than in industrial societies).

Physical exercise may increase life expectancy. People who participate in moderate to high levels of physical exercise have a lower mortality rate compared to individuals who are not physically active. Moderate levels of exercise have been correlated with preventing ageing and improving quality of life by reducing inflammatory potential. The majority of the benefits from exercise are achieved with around 3500 metabolic equivalent (MET) minutes per week. For example, climbing stairs 10 minutes, vacuuming 15 minutes, gardening 20 minutes, running 20 minutes, and walking or bicycling for 25 minutes on a daily basis would together achieve about 3000 MET minutes a week. Other research seems to suggest a relationship between regular physical exercise and cognitive functioning in old age.

Avoidance of chronic stress (as opposed to acute stress) is associated with a slower loss of telomeres in most but not all studies, and with decreased cortisol levels. A chronically high cortisol level compromises the immune system, causes cardiac damage/arterosclerosis and is associated with facial ageing, and the latter in turn is a marker for increased morbidity and mortality. A meta-analysis shows that loneliness carries a higher mortality risk than smoking. Stress can be countered by social connection, spirituality, and (for men more clearly than for women) married life, all of which are associated with longevity.

Medical intervention
The following drugs and interventions have been shown to slow or reverse the biological effects of ageing in animal models, but none has yet been proven to do so in humans. In a critical review, Wolf (2021) points out that these commonly promulgated anti-ageing compounds (resveratrol, rapamycin, nicotinamide mononucleotide and metformin) all cause weight loss, a feature that is "downplayed" in many anti-ageing publications; it is therefore likely that the compounds only counteract the life-shortening effects of obesity, and would not benefit individuals who have normal body weight.

Scientists have begun to explore calorie-restriction mimetics-natural and synthetic drug compounds that might yield the same health effects as calorie restriction, without dieting. These investigations are still in their early stages. Evidence in both animals and humans suggests that resveratrol may be a caloric restriction mimetic.

, metformin was under study for its potential effect on slowing ageing in the worm C.elegans and the cricket. Its effect on otherwise healthy humans is unknown. In 2019, Fahy and colleagues reported that a two-year trial on nine humans using metformin to regenerate thymus tissue unexpectedly resulted in a reversal of ageing as measured by DNA methylation levels.

Rapamycin was first shown to extend lifespan in eukaryotes in 2006 by Powers et al. who showed a dose-responsive effect of rapamycin on lifespan extension in yeast cells. In a 2009 study, the lifespans of mice fed rapamycin were increased between 28 and 38% from the beginning of treatment, or 9 to 14% in total increased maximum lifespan. Of particular note, the treatment began in mice aged 20 months, the equivalent of 60 human years. Rapamycin has subsequently been shown to extend mouse lifespan in several separate experiments, and is now being tested for this purpose in nonhuman primates (the marmoset monkey).

Cancer geneticist Ronald A. DePinho and his colleagues published research on mice where telomerase activity was first genetically removed. Then, after the mice had prematurely aged, they restored telomerase activity by reactivating the telomerase gene. As a result, the mice were rejuvenated: Shrivelled testes grew back to normal and the animals regained their fertility. Other organs, such as the spleen, liver, intestines and brain, recuperated from their degenerated state. "[The finding] offers the possibility that normal human ageing could be slowed by reawakening the enzyme in cells where it has stopped working" says Ronald DePinho. However, activating telomerase in humans could potentially encourage the growth of tumours.

Most known genetic interventions in C. elegans increase lifespan by 1.5 to 2.5-fold. , the record for lifespan extension in C. elegans is a single-gene mutation which increases adult survival by tenfold. The strong conservation of some of the mechanisms of ageing discovered in model organisms imply that they may be useful in the enhancement of human survival. However, the benefits may not be proportional; longevity gains are typically greater in C. elegans than fruit flies, and greater in fruit flies than in mammals. One explanation for this is that mammals, being much longer-lived, already have many traits which promote lifespan.

Mitochondria-targeted antioxidant SkQ1 has been shown to extend the lifespan of mice.

In 2023, researchers at the Sinclair Lab at Harvard Medical School were able to rejuvenate old mice via epigenetic changes by repairing the DNA with gene therapy. The cells of the mice updated and translated the genes into forms of protein, transforming the chromatin and the mice thus erasing aspects of aging.

Research projects and prizes
Some research effort is directed to slow ageing and extend healthy lifespan. 
In 1993, the Established populations for epidemiologic studies of the elderly, also known as the Yale Health and Aging Study, showed the importance of physical activity and argued against negative stereotypes concerning old age.

Dr. David Snowdon's Nun Study on aging and Alzheimer's disease has many interesting discoveries about memory, the impact of positively expressed emotions and how to live a longer, higher quality life.

The US National Institute on Aging currently funds an intervention testing programme, whereby investigators nominate compounds (based on specific molecular ageing theories) to have evaluated with respect to their effects on lifespan and age-related biomarkers in outbred mice. Previous age-related testing in mammals has proved largely irreproducible, because of small numbers of animals and lax mouse husbandry conditions. The intervention testing programme aims to address this by conducting parallel experiments at three internationally recognised mouse ageing-centres, the Barshop Institute at UTHSCSA, the University of Michigan at Ann Arbor and the Jackson Laboratory.

Several companies and organisations, such as Google Calico, Human Longevity, Craig Venter, Gero, SENS Research Foundation, and Science for Life Extension in Russia, declared stopping or delaying ageing as their goal.

Prizes for extending lifespan and slowing ageing in mammals exist. The Methuselah Foundation offers the Mprize. Recently, the $1 Million Palo Alto Longevity Prize was launched. It is a research incentive prize to encourage teams from all over the world to compete in an all-out effort to "hack the code" that regulates our health and lifespan. It was founded by Joon Yun.

Society and culture 

  

Different cultures express age in different ways. The age of an adult human is commonly measured in whole years since the day of birth. (The most notable exceptionEast Asian age reckoningis becoming less common, particularly in official contexts.) Arbitrary divisions set to mark periods of life may include juvenile (from infancy through childhood, preadolescence, and adolescence), early adulthood, middle adulthood, and late adulthood. Informal terms include "tweens", "teenagers", "twentysomething", "thirtysomething", etc. as well as "denarian", "vicenarian", "tricenarian", "quadragenarian", etc.

Most legal systems define a specific age for when an individual is allowed or obliged to do particular activities. These age specifications include voting age, drinking age, age of consent, age of majority, age of criminal responsibility, marriageable age, age of candidacy, and mandatory retirement age. Admission to a movie, for instance, may depend on age according to a motion picture rating system. A bus fare might be discounted for the young or old. Each nation, government, and non-governmental organisation has different ways of classifying age. In other words, chronological ageing may be distinguished from "social ageing" (cultural age-expectations of how people should act as they grow older) and "biological ageing" (an organism's physical state as it ages).

Ageism cost the United States $63 billion in one year according to a Yale School of Public Health study. In a UNFPA report about ageing in the 21st century, it highlighted the need to "Develop a new rights-based culture of ageing and a change of mindset and societal attitudes towards ageing and older persons, from welfare recipients to active, contributing members of society". UNFPA said that this "requires, among others, working towards the development of international human rights instruments and their translation into national laws and regulations and affirmative measures that challenge age discrimination and recognise older people as autonomous subjects". Older people's music participation contributes to the maintenance of interpersonal relationships and promoting successful ageing. At the same time, older persons can make contributions to society including caregiving and volunteering. For example, "A study of Bolivian migrants who [had] moved to Spain found that 69% left their children at home, usually with grandparents. In rural China, grandparents care for 38% of children aged under five whose parents have gone to work in cities."

Economics 

Population ageing is the increase in the number and proportion of older people in society. Population ageing has three possible causes: migration, longer life expectancy (decreased death rate) and decreased birth rate. Ageing has a significant impact on society. Young people tend to have fewer legal privileges (if they are below the age of majority), they are more likely to push for political and social change, to develop and adopt new technologies, and to need education. Older people have different requirements from society and government, and frequently have differing values as well, such as for property and pension rights.

In the 21st century, one of the most significant population trends is ageing. Currently, over 11% of the world's current population are people aged 60 and older and the United Nations Population Fund (UNFPA) estimates that by 2050 that number will rise to approximately 22%. Ageing has occurred due to development which has enabled better nutrition, sanitation, health care, education and economic well-being. Consequently, fertility rates have continued to decline and life expectancy has risen. Life expectancy at birth is over 80 now in 33 countries. Ageing is a "global phenomenon", that is occurring fastest in developing countries, including those with large youth populations, and poses social and economic challenges to the work which can be overcome with "the right set of policies to equip individuals, families and societies to address these challenges and to reap its benefits".

As life expectancy rises and birth rates decline in developed countries, the median age rises accordingly. According to the United Nations, this process is taking place in nearly every country in the world. A rising median age can have significant social and economic implications, as the workforce gets progressively older and the number of old workers and retirees grows relative to the number of young workers. Older people generally incur more health-related costs than do younger people in the workplace and can also cost more in worker's compensation and pension liabilities. In most developed countries an older workforce is somewhat inevitable. In the United States for instance, the Bureau of Labor Statistics estimates that one in four American workers will be 55 or older by 2020.

Among the most urgent concerns of older persons worldwide is income security. This poses challenges for governments with ageing populations to ensure investments in pension systems continues in order to provide economic independence and reduce poverty in old age. These challenges vary for developing and developed countries. UNFPA stated that, "Sustainability of these systems is of particular concern, particularly in developed countries, while social protection and old-age pension coverage remain a challenge for developing countries, where a large proportion of the labour force is found in the informal sector."

The global economic crisis has increased financial pressure to ensure economic security and access to health care in old age. In order to elevate this pressure "social protection floors must be implemented in order to guarantee income security and access to essential health and social services for all older persons and provide a safety net that contributes to the postponement of disability and prevention of impoverishment in old age".

It has been argued that population ageing has undermined economic development and can lead to lower inflation because elderly individuals care especially strongly about the value of their pensions and savings  Evidence suggests that pensions, while making a difference to the well-being of older persons, also benefit entire families especially in times of crisis when there may be a shortage or loss of employment within households. A study by the Australian Government in 2003 estimated that "women between the ages of 65 and 74 years contribute A$16 billion per year in unpaid caregiving and voluntary work. Similarly, men in the same age group contributed A$10 billion per year."

Due to increasing share of the elderly in the population, health care expenditures will continue to grow relative to the economy in coming decades. This has been considered as a negative phenomenon and effective strategies like labour productivity enhancement should be considered to deal with negative consequences of ageing.

Sociology
 
In the field of sociology and mental health, ageing is seen in five different views: ageing as maturity, ageing as decline, ageing as a life-cycle event, ageing as generation, and ageing as survival. Positive correlates with ageing often include economics, employment, marriage, children, education, and sense of control, as well as many others. The social science of ageing includes disengagement theory, activity theory, selectivity theory, and continuity theory. Retirement, a common transition faced by the elderly, may have both positive and negative consequences. As cyborgs currently are on the rise  some theorists argue there is a need to develop new definitions of ageing and for instance a bio-techno-social definition of ageing has been suggested.

There is a current debate as to whether or not the pursuit of longevity and the postponement of senescence are cost-effective health care goals given finite health care resources. Because of the accumulated infirmities of old age, bioethicist Ezekiel Emanuel, opines that the pursuit of longevity via the compression of morbidity hypothesis is a "fantasy" and that human life is not worth living after age 75; longevity then should not be a goal of health care policy. This opinion has been contested by neurosurgeon and medical ethicist Miguel Faria, who states that life can be worthwhile during old age, and that longevity should be pursued in association with the attainment of quality of life. Faria claims that postponement of senescence as well as happiness and wisdom can be attained in old age in a large proportion of those who lead healthy lifestyles and remain intellectually active.

Health care demand 

With age inevitable biological changes occur that increase the risk of illness and disability. UNFPA states that:

"A life-cycle approach to health care – one that starts early, continues through the reproductive years and lasts into old age – is essential for the physical and emotional well-being of older persons, and, indeed, all people. Public policies and programmes should additionally address the needs of older impoverished people who cannot afford health care."

Many societies in Western Europe and Japan have ageing populations. While the effects on society are complex, there is a concern about the impact on health care demand. The large number of suggestions in the literature for specific interventions to cope with the expected increase in demand for long-term care in ageing societies can be organised under four headings: improve system performance; redesign service delivery; support informal caregivers; and shift demographic parameters.

However, the annual growth in national health spending is not mainly due to increasing demand from ageing populations, but rather has been driven by rising incomes, costly new medical technology, a shortage of health care workers and informational asymmetries between providers and patients. A number of health problems become more prevalent as people get older. These include mental health problems as well as physical health problems, especially dementia.

It has been estimated that population ageing only explains 0.2 percentage points of the annual growth rate in medical spending of 4.3% since 1970. In addition, certain reforms to the Medicare system in the United States decreased elderly spending on home health care by 12.5% per year between 1996 and 2000.

Self-perception 
Beauty standards have evolved over time, and as scientific research in cosmeceuticals has increased, the industry has also expanded; the kinds of products they produce (such as serums and creams) have gradually gained popularity and become a part of many people's personal care routine. The cosmeceutical industry is currently the fastest growing beauty industry, with a market size of $49.5 billion for the year 2018.

The increase in demand for cosmeceuticals has led scientists to find ingredients for these products in unorthodox places. For example, the secretion of cryptomphalus aspersa (or brown garden snail) has been found to have antioxidant properties, increase skin cell proliferation, and increase extracellular proteins such as collagen and fibronectin (important proteins for cell proliferation). Another substance used to prevent the physical manifestations of ageing is onobotulinumtoxinA, the toxin injected for Botox.

Generally, aversion to aging is a Western attitude. However, in other places around the world, old age is celebrated and honored. In Korea, for example, a special party called hwangap is held to celebrate and congratulate an individual for turning 60 years old. In China, respect for elderly is often the basis for how a community is organized and has been at the foundation of Chinese culture and morality for thousands of years. Older people are respected for their wisdom and most important decisions have traditionally not been made without consulting them. This is a similar case for most Asian countries such as the Philippines, Thailand, Vietnam, Singapore, etc.

Positive self-perceptions of ageing are associated with better mental and physical health and well-being. Positive self-perception of health has been correlated with higher well-being and reduced mortality among the elderly. Various reasons have been proposed for this association; people who are objectively healthy may naturally rate their health better as than that of their ill counterparts, though this link has been observed even in studies which have controlled for socioeconomic status, psychological functioning and health status. This finding is generally stronger for men than women, though this relationship is not universal across all studies and may only be true in some circumstances.

As people age, subjective health remains relatively stable, even though objective health worsens. In fact, perceived health improves with age when objective health is controlled in the equation. This phenomenon is known as the "paradox of ageing". This may be a result of social comparison; for instance, the older people get, the more they may consider themselves in better health than their same-aged peers. Elderly people often associate their functional and physical decline with the normal ageing process.

One way to help younger people experience what it feels like to be older is through an ageing suit. There are several different kinds of suits including the GERT (named as a reference to gerontology), the R70i exoskeleton, and the AGNES (Age Gain Now Empathy Suit) suits. These suits create the feelings of the effects of ageing by adding extra weight and increased pressure in certain points like the wrists, ankles and other joints. In addition, the various suits have different ways to impair vision and hearing to simulate the loss of these senses. To create the loss of feeling in hands that the elderly experience, special gloves are a part of the uniforms.

Use of these suits may help to increase the amount of empathy felt for the elderly and could be considered particularly useful for those who are either learning about ageing, or those who work with the elderly, such as nurses or care center staff.

Empathy is another field that could benefit from the empathy these suits may cause. When designers understand what it feels like to have the impairments of old age, they can better design buildings, packaging, or even tools to help with the simple day-to-day tasks that are more difficult with less dexterity. Designing with the elderly in mind may help to reduce the negative feelings that are associated with the loss of abilities that the elderly face.

Successful ageing 
The concept of successful ageing can be traced back to the 1950s and was popularized in the 1980s. Traditional definitions of successful ageing have emphasized absence of physical and cognitive disabilities. In their 1987 article, Rowe and Kahn characterized successful ageing as involving three components: a) freedom from disease and disability, b) high cognitive and physical functioning, and c) social and productive engagement. The study cited previous was also done back in 1987 and therefore, these factors associated with successful aging have probably been changed. With the current knowledge, scientists started to focus on learning about the effect spirituality in successful aging. There are some differences in cultures which of these components are the most important. Most often across cultures social engagement was the most highly rated but depending on the culture the definition of successful ageing changes.

Cultural references 
The ancient Greek dramatist Euripides (5th century BC) describes the multiple-headed mythological monster Hydra as having a regenerative capacity which makes it immortal, which is the historical background to the name of the biological genus Hydra. The Book of Job (c. 6th century BC) describes human lifespan as inherently limited and makes a comparison with the innate immortality that a felled tree may have when undergoing vegetative regeneration.

See also 

 Ageing brain
 Ageing movement control
 Ageing of Europe
 Ageing studies
 Anti-ageing movement
 Biodemography of human longevity
 Biogerontology
 Biological immortality
 Biomarkers of ageing
 Clinical geropsychology
 Death
 DNA damage theory of aging
 Epigenetic clock
 Evolution of ageing
 Genetics of ageing
 Gerontechnology
 Gerontology
 Gerascophobia
 List of life extension-related topics
 Longevity
 Mitochondrial theory of ageing
 Neuroscience of ageing
 Old age
 Population ageing
 Progeria
 Rejuvenation
 Stem cell theory of ageing
 Supercentenarian
 Thermoregulation in humans
 Transgenerational design

References

External links 

 Ageing and Death in Folklore
Age Calculator Online
 Global AgeWatch – Statistics on population ageing and life expectancy
 HelpAge International and UNFPA (2012). Ageing in the 21st Century – A Celebration and a Challenge.

 
Gerontology
Old age